Tetrix is a genus of ground-hoppers or pygmy grasshoppers in the family Tetrigidae.  There are at least 180 described species in Tetrix.

Selected Species
See: List of Tetrix species
 Tetrix arenosa (obscure pygmy grasshopper)
 Tetrix ceperoi (Cepero's ground-hopper)
 Tetrix ornata (ornate pygmy grasshopper)
 Tetrix subulata (slender ground-hopper) - type species
 Tetrix undulata ('common' ground-hopper)

References

Caelifera genera